Kuzeybatı Worldwide Real Estate Services is a Turkish-based firm of real estate services.

History
The Company was established by Murat Ergin in 1994 in Istanbul. In 2006 Kuzeybatı has become an international associate of Savills.

Services
Kuzeybatı offers advisory and consultancy services in site selection, valuation, feasibility, investment, project development, and property management.

References

External links
Official website

Real estate services companies
Companies based in Istanbul
Real estate companies established in 1994